"Andalucia" is a song written by Welsh musician John Cale, released as the fourth track on his 1973 album Paris 1919. It was covered in 1990 by the alternative rock band Yo La Tengo, in their album Fakebook.

Recording 
Andalucia is the fourth song in Cale's 1973 album, Paris 1919. The backing band for the song, and the rest of the album were not credited until 2006 in the expanded version. The lyrics are interpreted in multiple ways - either about Andalusia, Spain, or a person from that area. The lyrics are delivered as though Cale is about to break down, giving the song a delicate feel.

Release and reception 
Following Paris 1919'''s release in 1973, the reviews were mostly favourable. Rolling Stone calls "Andalucia" the "most beautiful" song on the album.Far Out Magazine said it, "focuses on the Andalucian landscape, as he sings of a wanderer captivated by the countryside, feeling that it takes part of his soul. The composition is one of the sparser on the album, connecting the chiming acoustic guitar of his vocals."

 Alternate version 
In 2006, a reissue of Paris 1919 was released, featuring bonus tracks - rehearsals and alternate versions, and a hidden track (an instrumental of "Macbeth"). The "Andalucia" rehearsal track is mostly an instrumental, only featuring John Cale singing a small amount of the lyrics. It was recorded earlier than the album version - showing Cale's original visualization for the song - far more delicate.

 Yo La Tengo 
Yo La Tengo covered Andalucia in 1990, on Fakebook'', which mostly features covers. The instruments are more low key in this version, placing more emphasis on Ira Kaplan's delivery of the lyrics. It has been described as "only slightly less fragile" lyrics-wise - likely due to Ira Kaplan's American accent as opposed to John Cale's Welsh.

References 

1973 songs
John Cale songs
Song recordings produced by Chris Thomas (record producer)